Christopher Patrick Coleman  (born 10 June 1970) is a Welsh professional football manager and former player, who is the current manager of Super League Greece club Atromitos.

As a player, Coleman usually played in defence, while also occasionally appearing as a forward. He began his career at Manchester City, leaving as a teenager to make his debut for hometown team Swansea City in 1987. In 1991, he joined Crystal Palace, whom he represented in the Premier League. He spent a year-and-a-half at league champions Blackburn Rovers before signing for Fulham in 1997, helping the team to two promotions from the third tier to the top flight. He won 32 caps playing for Wales. Coleman's playing career ended at the age of 32, when his leg was broken in a car crash.

Following this, he started his coaching career at Fulham. In his first full season as manager, he guided the club to ninth place in the 2003–04 Premier League. After leaving Fulham, Coleman was appointed manager of Real Sociedad, where he resigned in January 2008 due to differences with the incoming president. He returned to England to manage Coventry City, but was dismissed in May 2010 following a poor run of results. Coleman then managed Greek side AEL for the first half of the 2011–12 season before resigning due to financial troubles at the club. In 2012, he took over as Wales national team manager after the death of Gary Speed, and led Wales to UEFA Euro 2016, their first major tournament since the 1958 FIFA World Cup, where they made the semi-finals.

Early life
Coleman was born in Swansea to an Irish father and has two sisters. He was educated at St Joseph's Roman Catholic Primary School and Bishop Vaughan Catholic School. Coleman has been nicknamed "Cookie" since childhood, as friends likened his eating habits to the Cookie Monster from Sesame Street.

Playing career

Club

Swansea City
The first professional team Coleman was contracted to was Manchester City, aged 16, although he later left them, citing homesickness as the major reason. He then joined his hometown club Swansea City.

He made his first professional appearance for them aged 17, in the autumn of 1987. He made nearly 200 appearances for the south Wales club and helped win the Welsh Cup in 1989 and 1991.

Crystal Palace
After spending four years with Swansea, Coleman was signed by Crystal Palace in 1991 for a transfer fee set by a Football League tribunal at around £270,000, plus a percentage of any future sale. After making 143 appearances, scoring 16 goals in that period – a 1 in 9 record explained by the fact that manager Steve Coppell often used Coleman as a makeshift centre forward. Palace finished 10th in Coleman's first season at Selhurst Park, but they were relegated from the new FA Premier League in his second season (although they did reach the semi-finals of the League Cup). They won promotion as Division One champions at the first attempt, but went straight back down again despite reaching the semi-finals of both cups that season. Coleman was sold to Blackburn Rovers, the defending league champions, for £2.8 million in December 1995. While at Palace, he was capped for Wales at senior level for the first time.

In 2005, Palace supporters voted Coleman into their Centenary XI.

Blackburn Rovers
Coleman joined Premier League champions Blackburn Rovers for a fee of £2.8 million. Blackburn did not retain the Premier League title they had won in 1995, and finished seventh, just missing out on a UEFA Cup place. Coleman made 28 league appearances over his season-and-a-half at the club, and when he found himself out of the starting line-up too often (not helped by a persistent Achilles injury), he took the gamble to further his career by dropping two divisions to join Fulham.

Fulham
Fulham, at the time in the third tier, were financed by wealthy businessman Mohamed Al-Fayed, and were able to spend a record transfer fee for the division and club, of £2.1 million for Coleman in late 1997. He quickly became club captain, and led Fulham to promotion under manager Kevin Keegan in 1998–99 to the First Division.

He remained captain and a regular in the team under new manager Jean Tigana in the 2000–01 season as Fulham made a successful start to the campaign. However, Coleman's career was effectively ended midway through the season, after he broke his leg in a car crash, near Bletchingley in Surrey on 2 January 2001, just days before an FA Cup tie against Manchester United. He never recovered from this injury despite playing a reserve fixture in March 2002, a game that only served as an indication that he would never again play at the highest level of English football. He announced his retirement as a player in October 2002, but stayed at the West London club as a member of the coaching staff.

International
Coleman was eligible to play for his birth country of Wales, for the Republic of Ireland through his Dublin-born father, and also for the United States via his maternal grandfather.

Coleman was capped by Wales at school, youth, under-21 and senior levels. His only competitive football appearance after his leg injuries came for Wales on 14 May 2002, when he was called up to the squad as a replacement for Danny Gabbidon, and then came on as a late substitute for goalscorer Robert Earnshaw in the 1–0 win over Germany at the Millennium Stadium.

Managerial career

Fulham
Coleman joined Fulham's coaching staff in October 2002 under Tigana. He later succeeded the Frenchman as caretaker manager in April 2003, and steered Fulham away from relegation danger. He was named as Fulham's permanent manager in May 2003, beating the more experienced Klaus Toppmöller and George Burley to the post, and also became the youngest manager in the Premier League.

His first full season in charge saw Fulham finish a surprise ninth place, as many pundits tipped them to struggle and for Coleman to be sacked. Many of Fulham's key players, such as Edwin van der Sar, Louis Saha, Steed Malbranque and Luís Boa Morte, were sold in the following years and Fulham did not repeat their earlier successes under Coleman though he kept them clear of relegation. He was sacked on 10 April 2007 in a move that caught some observers by surprise, after a seven-game winless run that left the club four points above the relegation zone.

Real Sociedad
Coleman moved abroad to manage recently relegated Segunda División side Real Sociedad on 4 July 2007, after being recommended to the club by fellow Welshman and former Real Sociedad manager John Toshack. He was linked with Bolton Wanderers in October 2007
though nothing came of it. With the club in 5th place and having only lost once in its previous eleven games, Coleman resigned as manager on 16 January 2008, citing a divergence in vision for the club with newly elected President Iñaki Badiola.

Coventry City
Coleman was appointed manager of Championship club Coventry City on 19 February 2008, signing a three-and-a-half-year contract. He replaced Iain Dowie, who had been sacked by new owner Ray Ranson.

On 26 August 2008, the BBC reported that Coleman was no longer interested in the Wales national team. He later said that his words had been misinterpreted; when answering a question on whether Coventry striker Freddy Eastwood was fit to play for Wales, he meant to say that he wanted Eastwood fit for club before returning to international duty. On 4 May 2010, Coleman was sacked following Coventry's 19th-place finish during the 2009–10 season, their lowest league finish in more than 45 years. They would be relegated two years later.

AEL
On 26 May 2011, Coleman was appointed as manager of Greek side AEL. In January 2012, Coleman announced that because of financial troubles at the club he would be quitting from his position as manager.

Wales

On 19 January 2012, Coleman was appointed team manager of the Wales national team, as successor to his friend Gary Speed, who had died the previous November. After letting his assistant Osian Roberts take charge in Speed's memorial match against Costa Rica in February, his first game in charge was a 2–0 defeat against Mexico at the MetLife Stadium in New Jersey on 27 May.

Wales' first match in 2014 FIFA World Cup qualification was on 7 September at home to Belgium, with centre back James Collins sent off for a late lunge on Guillaume Gillet in the 25th minute of an eventual 0–2 loss. Four days later in Novi Sad, the team lost 6–1 to Serbia; Coleman said in October 2015 that he considered leaving his post after the defeat. After becoming the first Welsh manager to lose his first five games, Coleman got his first win on 12 October 2012, a 2–1 victory against Scotland. On 26 March 2013, in a qualifier against Croatia at the Liberty Stadium, Wales led 1–0 for the majority of the game through a Gareth Bale penalty, but two late goals from the opponents ended any hopes of qualification.

In October 2015, Coleman led Wales to their best ever position on the FIFA World Rankings, 8th. On 10 October, their qualification for the UEFA Euro 2016 tournament was confirmed, a first tournament qualification since 1958. The team came first in their group in France, and eliminated Northern Ireland and Belgium to reach the semi-finals, losing to eventual champions Portugal. Coleman received interest from other teams due to his management of the Welsh team at the tournament.

On 23 May 2016, it was announced at a Football Association of Wales press conference that Coleman had signed a two-year contract extension to take in the 2018 World Cup qualifying campaign. Wales's 1–0 home loss to the Republic of Ireland on 9 October 2017 meant that they were eliminated from qualification. Coleman resigned as Wales manager on 17 November.

Sunderland
On 19 November 2017, Coleman was appointed as the new manager of under-performing Championship club Sunderland. He replaced a dismissed Simon Grayson, who had left the Black Cats third from bottom of the league table in twenty-second place and within the relegation drop zone.  Coleman's first game in charge was a 2–1 defeat at Aston Villa, two days after his appointment. By the conclusion of 2017, Sunderland had collected eleven points, out of a possible twenty-four, under Coleman's guidance, briefly lifting out of the relegation zone into twenty-first place, following a satisfactory run of form.

During the winter transfer window, Coleman was informed that club chairman Ellis Short had refused to invest any more money into player transfers, with the American businessman announcing his intentions to sell the club. Joining the club for free of charge included the loan signings of Jake Clarke-Salter from Chelsea, Ovie Ejaria from Liverpool, Lee Camp from Cardiff City and Ashley Fletcher from fierce rivals Middlesbrough; Kazenga LuaLua was the only permanent transfer that window, joining from Brighton & Hove Albion on a free transfer.

After their transfer window nightmare, Sunderland went on a nine-game winless run, ending when they defeated Derby County 4–1 at Pride Park. This was Coleman's final victory in charge of Sunderland; his final six games saw the Black Cats record three draws and three defeats. Relegation to League One was confirmed following a 2–1 defeat against Burton Albion at the Stadium of Light. His final game in charge was a 2–1 defeat to Fulham. On 29 April 2018, Coleman was dismissed shortly following the club's sale.

Hebei China Fortune 
On 10 June 2018, Coleman was appointed as the head coach of Chinese club Hebei China Fortune, as successor to Manuel Pellegrini, who left the side to return to the Premier League with West Ham United. The club had become notable during the year for completing the high-profile signing of Javier Mascherano from Spanish La Liga giants Barcelona. His side finished the 2018 Super League season in sixth position, two places and fourteen points adrift from qualification to the 2019 AFC Champions League.

Coleman's side struggled to adapt in the 2019 league campaign, with the club sat in fifteenth place, in the relegation zone, following nine games. Having only won one game that league season, a 2–1 victory over Shanghai Greenland Shenhua, he was sacked on 15 May due to poor performance.

Personal life
He is married to TV presenter Charlotte Jackson. They had a son at the end of 2014. Coleman's godson is Republic of Ireland international Ronan Curtis, who plays as a forward for Portsmouth.

In June 2010, Coleman worked as a commentator for ITV at the 2010 FIFA World Cup in South Africa. He has also worked as a commentator and pundit for Sky Sports. For Euro 2020, he is working for ESPN.

On 20 October 2016 he was awarded the Freedom of the City of Swansea. Coleman was appointed Officer of the Order of the British Empire (OBE) in the 2017 New Year Honours for services to football. In 2017, he was awarded an honorary degree from his hometown's University of Swansea, and fellowships at both Bangor University and University of Wales Trinity Saint David. In July 2017, he endorsed the Welsh Government's project to double the number of speakers of Welsh by 2050.

Career statistics

Managerial statistics

Honours

Player
Swansea City
Welsh Cup: 1988–89, 1990–91

Crystal Palace
Football League First Division: 1993–94

Fulham
Football League Second Division: 1998–99
Football League First Division: 2000–01

Individual
Football League Third Division PFA Team of the Year: 1988–89, 1990–91
Football League Second Division PFA Team of the Year: 1997–98, 1998–99
Football League First Division PFA Team of the Year: 1999–2000, 2000–01
Crystal Palace Player of the Year: 1994

Manager

Wales 

3rd (Joint) Euro 2016

Individual
Football League Championship Manager of the Month: February 2009

References

External links

1970 births
Living people
Welsh people of Irish descent
Welsh people of American descent
Welsh Roman Catholics
Footballers from Swansea
Welsh footballers
Wales schools international footballers
Wales youth international footballers
Wales under-21 international footballers
Wales international footballers
Association football defenders
Manchester City F.C. players
Swansea City A.F.C. players
Crystal Palace F.C. players
Blackburn Rovers F.C. players
Fulham F.C. players
English Football League players
Premier League players
Welsh football managers
Fulham F.C. managers
Real Sociedad managers
Coventry City F.C. managers
Athlitiki Enosi Larissa F.C. managers
Wales national football team managers
Sunderland A.F.C. managers
Hebei F.C. managers
Premier League managers
Segunda División managers
English Football League managers
UEFA Euro 2016 managers
Welsh expatriate football managers
Expatriate football managers in Spain
Expatriate football managers in Greece
Expatriate football managers in China
Welsh expatriate sportspeople in Spain
Welsh expatriate sportspeople in Greece
Welsh expatriate sportspeople in China
British association football commentators
Officers of the Order of the British Empire
Chinese Super League managers
People associated with Swansea University
People associated with Bangor University
People associated with University of Wales Trinity Saint David